Stone House on Tanner's Creek is located near Salvisa, Kentucky.  It was built in about 1800 and added to the National Register of Historic Places in 1983.

It is a one-and-a-half-story hall-parlor house with a stone kitchen that is now attached.

When listed it had stonework in excellent condition, including mostly original mortar.

References

National Register of Historic Places in Woodford County, Kentucky
Federal architecture in Kentucky
Houses completed in 1800
Houses in Woodford County, Kentucky
Houses on the National Register of Historic Places in Kentucky
Stone houses in Kentucky
1800 establishments in Kentucky
Hall-parlor plan architecture in the United States